Barygenys flavigularis is a species of frog in the family Microhylidae.
It is endemic to Papua New Guinea, known from several localities in the mountains around Wau.
Its natural habitat is subtropical or tropical moist montane forests. The population is unknown but is considered locally abundant and occurs in Mount Kaindi Wildlife Management Area.

References

Barygenys
Amphibians of Papua New Guinea
Amphibians described in 1972
Taxonomy articles created by Polbot